Diaphorostylus is a genus of flies in the family Stratiomyidae.

Species
Diaphorostylus flavipes Kertész, 1908
Diaphorostylus interruptus James, 1939
Diaphorostylus nasica (Williston, 1888)
Diaphorostylus signatipes Kertész, 1908

References

Stratiomyidae
Brachycera genera
Taxa named by Kálmán Kertész
Diptera of North America
Diptera of South America